"Srdcia dievčat" is a song by the female singer Marika Gombitová released on OPUS in 1982.

The composition was written by Ján Lauko and Kamil Peteraj, and issued as the pilot single of the singer's studio album Slnečný kalendár (1982).

The single was the first released in digital format from the singer's second album re-release entitled Môj malý príbeh: Komplet 2. The B-side of the single is "Slnečný kalendár".

Official versions
 "Srdcia dievčat" - Studio version, 1982

Credits and personnel
 Marika Gombitová - lead vocal, music
 Ján Lauko - music
 Kamil Peteraj - lyrics
 OPUS - copyright

References

General

Specific

External links 
 
 

1982 songs
1982 singles
Marika Gombitová songs
Songs written by Marika Gombitová
Songs written by Kamil Peteraj
Slovak-language songs